Budiman Sudjatmiko (born 10 March 1970 in Cilacap, Central Java) is an Indonesian activist and politician from Indonesian Democratic Party of Struggle. He was a political prisoner during the final years of the Suharto regime.

Early life and education
Sudjatmiko is the son of Wartono (father) and Sri Sulastri (mother). He attended State Senior High School (SMAN) 5 Kota Bogor in Bogor, West Java province.

In addition to studying Economics at Gadjah Mada University, Budiman gained two master's degrees, both in International Relations, from the University of London's School of Oriental and African Studies (SOAS) and at Clare Hall, Cambridge.

Political activism and jail
Budiman studied economics at Gadjah Mada University, where he immersed himself in student movements and started to organize civil movements in Java. Inspired by revolutionary movements, he dropped out of university to focus on a people power movement. He was chairman of the People's Democratic Association (Perhimpunan Rakyat Demokratik), which in July 1996 formed the People's Democratic Party (PRD) -- at a time when it was illegal to form political parties. PRD opposed the regime of long-serving President Suharto.

Shortly after the PRD's declaration, state troops and hired thugs on 27 July 1996 attacked pro-democracy activists during a protest in Central Jakarta, killing at least five people. Budiman was made a scapegoat for the riot and PRD was accused of being a communist organization that had sought to forcibly overthrow the government. The military and police sought to arrest Budiman and exerted pressure on his parents. On 5 August 1996, Lieutenant General Syarwan Hamid claimed there were "indications" that Budiman's father was a former member of the outlawed Indonesian Communist Party. Budiman was arrested on 11 August 1996, accused of subversion and insulting the government. In April 1997, he received a 13 year jail sentence. He was released on 10 December 1999, more than one year and six months after Suharto's downfall.

Budiman was a supporter of reformist President Abdurrahman Wahid, who was impeached and removed from power on 23 July 2001 after losing the support of the military and parliament. Prior to Wahid's removal, Budiman was among a group of 40 people—mostly foreigners—briefly detained when police and an Islamic militia group raided an anti-globalization conference in Depok on 8 June 2001. Budiman later in 2001 resigned as chairman of PRD.

Post-PRD career
In 2002, Budiman resigned from PRD to pursue a master's degree in political studies at SOAS University of London. He later pursued a Master of Philosophy degree in International Relations at the University of Cambridge.

Political career 
In December 2004, he joined the Indonesian Democratic Party of Struggle (PDI-P), one of Indonesia's major political parties. On this movement, he commented:
Although there is still much which must be sorted out in terms of professionalism, ethics and morals, in the vision of struggle and other programs within the PDI-P, all of this is a challenge for the PDI-P to become the party of the little people.
He is currently the director of ResPublica Institute, an Indonesian defense think tank.

References

External links 

1970 births
Living people
People from Cilacap Regency
Alumni of Clare Hall, Cambridge
Alumni of SOAS University of London
Gadjah Mada University alumni
Indonesian activists
Indonesian Democratic Party of Struggle politicians